Jelly Babies are a type of soft sugar jelly sweets in the shape of plump babies, sold in a variety of colours. They were first manufactured in Lancashire, England, in the nineteenth century. Their popularity waned before being revived by Bassett's of Sheffield in Yorkshire, who began mass-producing Jelly Babies (initially sold as "Peace Babies") in 1918.

History
"Jelly Babies" are known at least since advertisements by Riches Confectionery Company of 22 Duke Street, London Bridge in 1885, along with a variety of other baby sweets, including "Tiny Totties" and "Sloper’s  Babies". But the pricing of these, at one farthing each, suggests that they were very much larger than the modern Jelly Baby.

The sweets were invented in 1864 by an Austrian immigrant working at Fryers of Lancashire, and were originally marketed as "Unclaimed Babies." By 1918 they were produced by Bassett's in Sheffield as "Peace Babies," to mark the end of World War I. Bassett's themselves have supported the "Peace Babies" name. Production was suspended during World War II due to wartime shortages. The product was relaunched as "Jelly Babies" in 1953.

A line of sweets called Jellyatrics was launched by Barnack Confectionery Ltd to commemorate the "Jelly Baby’s 80th Birthday" in March 1999. Jellyatrics celebrate "all that is great and good about the older generation".

Manufacture

The most noted modern manufacturer of Jelly Babies, Bassett's, now allocate individual name, shape, colour and flavour to different babies: Brilliant (red; strawberry), Bubbles (yellow; lemon), Baby Bonny (pink; raspberry), Boofuls (green; lime), Bigheart (purple; blackcurrant), and Bumper (orange).

The introduction of different shapes and names was an innovation, circa 1989, prior to which all colours of jelly baby were a uniform shape. Bassett's Jelly Babies changed in September 2007 to include only natural colours and ingredients. There are many brands of jelly babies, as well as supermarket own brands.

Jelly Babies manufactured in the United Kingdom tend to be dusted in starch, which is left over from the manufacturing process, where it is used to aid release from the mould. Jelly Babies manufactured in Australia generally lack this coating. Like most other gummy sweets, they contain gelatin.

In popular culture

Jelly Babies were referred to as "those kids’ candies" in an episode of Supercar in 1962, "Operation Superstork". In October 1963, as Beatlemania was breaking out, fans of The Beatles in the United Kingdom pelted the band with jelly babies (or, in the United States, the much harder jelly beans) after it was reported that George Harrison liked eating them.

In the television programme Doctor Who, jelly babies were often mentioned in the classic series, as a confection The Doctor, an alien time traveller, favoured. They were first seen being consumed by the Second Doctor but they became most associated with Tom Baker’s Fourth Doctor, who had the predilection for offering them to strangers to defuse tense situations (and, in one episode, bluffing an opponent into believing them a weapon). The Sixth, Seventh, Eighth, Eleventh and Twelfth Doctors, as well as the nemesis of the Doctor, The Master, also offered them up, in different episodes. In the series, they were often identified simply, by the fact the Doctor (and later the Master) usually carried them around, in a white paper bag.

In the series by Terry Pratchett, Discworld, the country of Djelibeybi (a pun on "jelly baby", but putatively meaning "Child of the (River) Djel", and possibly derived from Djellaba), is the Discworld's analogue of Ancient Egypt. The main setting of Pyramids, Djelibeybi is about two miles (3200 m) wide, along the 150-mile (240 km) length of the Djel.

In the episode Ottery St. Mary of the BBC Radio programme Cabin Pressure (season 3, episode 4), pilots Martin and Douglas perform a “pre-flight check” bit while preparing to drive Martin’s removals van to Devon. After cross-checking doors, seatbelts, and the piano the crew are delivering, Douglas continues the check, asking “Jelly Babies?”, followed by the sound of a bag crinkling as Martin replies, “Jelly Babies to manual”.

Australian singer, Alison Hams, released the "Jelly Baby Song" in May 2013 – its content alluding to the consumption of jelly babies by Type 1 Diabetics to overcome hypoglycaemic episodes – as a way to raise awareness for Type 1 Diabetes, for JDRF Australia (Juvenile Diabetes Research Foundation) who sell specially packaged jelly babies, as the focus of their annual campaign "Jelly Baby Month".

A popular school chemistry experiment, is to put them in a strong oxidising agent, and see the resulting spectacular reaction. The experiment is commonly referred to as "screaming jelly babies".

A poll of 4,000 adults in Britain voted jelly babies their sixth favourite sweet in August 2009. Jelly Babies are the favourite snack of the British children's sitcom character Basil Brush, a puppet fox.

In the 2018 film Johnny English Strikes Again, the titular character (played by Rowan Atkinson) carries a box of jelly babies with him, but they are actually disguised explosives, as in said context, "jelly" is actually short for gelignite, and they blow up whoever eats them.

References

Brand name confectionery
Products introduced in 1918
Candy
British confectionery
Cadbury brands
Mondelez International brands
Gummi candies